Robinsonekspedisjonen 2015, is the fourteenth season of the Norwegian version of the Swedish show Expedition Robinson. This season premiered on February 8, 2015 and concluded on May 10, 2015. This season marked a change for the program's channel. For the first time since the series debut Robinsonekspedisjonen was not aired on TV3, but rather on rival channel TV2. This season was filmed prior to TV2's acquisition of Robinson's broadcasting rights. In addition to this, as an added twist a set of twins, Vita and Wanda Mashadi, entered the game together. Also, Rolf Florida Kristensen is the brother of 2010 winner Alita Dagmar Kristensen. This season premiered with an average of over 480,000 viewers with a peak of 537,000 viewers in its second hour. This is the single highest viewership for the program in its sixteen-year history. In episode three, Vita and Wanda left the secret island they'd been living on since the game's start and were each added to one of the two tribes.

Finishing Order

The Game

Voting history

 During the first challenge of the season Helena and Julian won immunity via finding immunity idols on the island.

Reference List

External links
Official Site

2015 Norwegian television seasons
2015